Vekaria is a village and former non-salute princely state  on Saurashtra peninsula in Gujarat, western India.

History 
Vekaria was a petty princely state in Sorath prant in Western Kathiawar, comprising solely the village, ruled by Kathi Chieftains.

It had a population of 595 in 1901, yielding a state revenue of 6,105 Rupees (1903-4, nearly all from land) and paying a tribute of 55 Rupees, to the Gaekwar Baroda State.

External links and Sources 
History
 Imperial Gazetteer, on dsal.uchicago.edu - Kathiawar

Princely states of Gujarat
Kathi princely states